Map the Soul (魂) is Epik High's book album which was released on March 27, 2009.

The first single from the album is "Map the Soul (ft. MYK)". The album is Epik High's first venture under their own independent label, Map the Soul Inc.

Many tracks on the album were consciously recorded with the international fans in mind, with collaborations from Asian American artists (also labelmates) Kero One & MYK, as well as lyrics in both English and Korean.

The complimentary book (ordered directly from the official site) contains information detailing the album creation process.

Track listing 
From iTunes.

References

External links
 MapTheSoul.com Official Site

Epik High albums